Arashi (or Arasji) is a settlement and beach on the northwestern tip of Aruba, in Noord district. It is close to Malmok, Kudarebe and the California Lighthouse. The beach is popular for swimming and snorkeling.

Preservation 
The Arashi Beach is a participant in the Aruba Reef Care Project to clean up reefs, shallow waters and public beaches. Arashi is Blue Flag certified, part of a program to promote green behavior and increase eco-awareness on the island.

References

External links
Arashi Beach - Official Aruba Tourism Portal
Aruba Beach and Marina Blue Flag Program

Beaches of Aruba